Streptogramins are a class of antibiotics.

Streptogramins are effective in the treatment of vancomycin-resistant Staphylococcus aureus (VRSA) and vancomycin-resistant Enterococcus (VRE), two of the most rapidly growing strains of multidrug-resistant bacteria. They fall into two groups: streptogramin A and streptogramin B.

Members include:
 Quinupristin/dalfopristin
 Pristinamycin
 Virginiamycin
 NXL 103, an experimental streptogramin in clinical trials for the treatment of respiratory tract infections.

References

Antibiotics